Franz Biedermann (born 4 May 1946) is a Liechtenstein athlete. He competed in the men's decathlon at the 1968 Summer Olympics.

References

1946 births
Living people
Athletes (track and field) at the 1968 Summer Olympics
Liechtenstein decathletes
Olympic athletes of Liechtenstein
People from Vaduz